C, or c, is the third letter in the Latin alphabet, used in the modern English alphabet, the alphabets of other western European languages and others worldwide. Its name in English is cee (pronounced ), plural cees.

History

"C" comes from the same letter as "G". The Semites named it gimel. The sign is possibly adapted from an Egyptian hieroglyph for a staff sling, which may have been the meaning of the name gimel. Another possibility is that it depicted a camel, the Semitic name for which was gamal. Barry B. Powell, a specialist in the history of writing, states "It is hard to imagine how gimel = "camel" can be derived from the picture of a camel (it may show his hump, or his head and neck!)".

In the Etruscan language, plosive consonants had no contrastive voicing, so the Greek 'Γ' (Gamma) was adopted into the Etruscan alphabet to represent . Already in the Western Greek alphabet, Gamma first took a '' form in Early Etruscan, then '' in Classical Etruscan. In Latin it eventually took the '' form in Classical Latin. Of these, '' was used to represent  or  before a rounded vowel, '' before '', and '' elsewhere. The use of '' (and its variant '') replaced most usages of '' and ''. Hence, in the classical period and after, '' was treated as the equivalent of Greek gamma, and '' as the equivalent of kappa; this shows in the romanization of Greek words, as in 'ΚΑΔΜΟΣ', 'ΚΥΡΟΣ', and 'ΦΩΚΙΣ' came into Latin as '', '' and '', respectively.

Other alphabets have letters homoglyphic to 'c' but not analogous in use and derivation, like the Cyrillic letter Es (С, с) which derives from the lunate sigma, named due to its resemblance to the crescent moon.

Later use
When the Roman alphabet was introduced into Britain,  represented only , and this value of the letter has been retained in loanwords to all the insular Celtic languages: in Welsh, Irish, and Gaelic,  represents only . On the continent, meanwhile, a similar phonetic change before the same two vowels had also been going on in almost all modern romance languages (for example, in Italian).

The letter thus represented two distinct values. Subsequently, the Latin phoneme  (spelled ) de-labialized to  meaning that the various Romance languages had  before front vowels. The sound , to which Old English palatalized  had advanced, also occurred in French, chiefly from Latin  before .

Thus, to show etymology, English spelling has advise, devise (instead of *advize, *devize), while advice, device, dice, ice, mice, twice, etc., do not reflect etymology; example has extended this to hence, pence, defence, etc., where there is no etymological reason for using . Former generations also wrote sence for sense. Hence, today the Romance languages and English have a common feature inherited from Vulgar Latin spelling conventions where  takes on either a "hard" or "soft" value depending on the following letter.

Pronunciation and use

English
However, there are a number of exceptions in English: "soccer" and "Celt" are words that have  where  would be expected.

The "soft"  may represent the  sound in the digraph  when this precedes a vowel, as in the words 'delicious' and 'appreciate', and also in the word "ocean" and its derivatives.

The trigraph  always represents .

The digraph  is often used to represent the sound   after short vowels, like "wicket".

C is the twelfth most frequently used letter in the English language (after E, T, A, O, I, N, S, H, R, D, and L), with a frequency of about 2.8% in words.

Other languages
In the Spanish spoken in most of Spain, the soft  is a voiceless dental fricative .

Dutch uses  the most, for all Romance loans and the digraph , but unlike English, does not use  for native Germanic words like komen, "come". Swedish has the same rules for soft and hard  as Danish, and also uses  in the digraph  and the very common word och, "and".

All Balto-Slavic languages that use the Latin alphabet, as well as Albanian, Hungarian, Pashto, several Sami languages, Esperanto, Ido, Interlingua, and Americanist phonetic notation (and those aboriginal languages of North America whose practical orthography derives from it) use  to represent , the voiceless alveolar or voiceless dental sibilant affricate. In Hanyu Pinyin, the standard romanization of Mandarin Chinese, the letter represents an aspirated version of this sound, .

Among non-European languages that have adopted the Latin alphabet,  represents a variety of sounds. In Azeri, Crimean Tatar, Kurmanji Kurdish, and Turkish  stands for the voiced counterpart of this sound, the voiced postalveolar affricate . In Yabem and similar languages, such as Bukawa,  stands for a glottal stop . Xhosa and Zulu use this letter to represent the click .

The letter  is also used as a transliteration of Cyrillic  in the Latin forms of Serbian, Macedonian, and sometimes Ukrainian, along with the digraph .

Other systems
As a phonetic symbol, lowercase  is the International Phonetic Alphabet (IPA) and X-SAMPA symbol for the voiceless palatal plosive, and capital  is the X-SAMPA symbol for the voiceless palatal fricative.

Digraphs

As in English, with the value , is often used after short vowels in other Germanic languages such as German and Swedish (other Germanic languages, such as Dutch and Norwegian, use  instead). The digraph  represents  in Old English, Italian, and a few languages related to Italian (where this only happens before front vowels, while otherwise it represents ). The trigraph  represents  in German.

Related characters

Ancestors, descendants and siblings

𐤂 : Semitic letter Gimel, from which the following symbols originally derive
 : Greek letter Gamma, from which C derives
G g : Latin letter G, which is derived from Latin C
Ȝ ȝ : Latin letter Ȝ, which is derived from Latin G
Phonetic alphabet symbols related to C:
 : Small c with curl
ʗ : Stretched c
𝼏 : Stretched c with curl - Used by Douglas Beach for a nasal click in his phonetic description of Khoekhoe
𝼝 : Small letter c with retroflex hook - Para-IPA version of the IPA retroflex tʂ
ꟲ : Modifier letter capital c - Used to mark tone for the Chatino orthography in Oaxaca, Mexico; Used as a generic transcription for a falling tone; Used in para-IPA notation
ᶜ : Modifier letter small c
ᶝ : Modifier letter small c with curl
ᴄ : Small capital c is used in the Uralic Phonetic Alphabet.
Ꞔ ꞔ : C with palatal hook, used for writing Mandarin Chinese using the early draft version of pinyin romanization during the mid-1950s
Add to C with diacritics
C with diacritics: Ć ć Ĉ ĉ Č č Ċ ċ Ḉ ḉ Ƈ ƈ C̈ c̈ Ȼ ȼ Ç ç Ꞔ ꞔ Ꞓ ꞓ
Ↄ ↄ : Claudian letters

Derived ligatures, abbreviations, signs and symbols
© : copyright symbol
℃ : degree Celsius
¢ : cent
₡ : colón (currency)
₢ : Brazilian cruzeiro (currency)
₵ : Ghana cedi (currency)
₠ : European Currency Unit CE
 : blackboard bold C, denoting the complex numbers
ℭ : blackletter C
Ꜿ ꜿ : Medieval abbreviation for Latin syllables con- and com-, Portuguese -us and -os

Code points 
These are the code points for the forms of the letter in various systems

 1 

In Unicode, C is also encoded in various font styles for mathematical purposes; see Mathematical Alphanumeric Symbols.

Other representations

Use as a number
In the hexadecimal (base 16) numbering system, C is a number that corresponds to the number 12 in decimal (base 10) counting.

In the Roman numeral system, C represents 100.

See also
Hard and soft C
Speed of light, c

References

External links

ISO basic Latin letters